The Magic Cup is a lost 1921 American silent adventure film directed by John S. Robertson and written by E. Lloyd Sheldon. It stars Constance Binney, Vincent Coleman, and Blanche Craig.

Plot
Every time Mary Mallory needs money she pawns a silver cup which her mother left to her. The Patrician, a crook, tells Abe the pawn broker, that Mary must be the granddaughter of Lord Fitzroy, an Irish nobleman. One of the crooks impersonates Fitzroy and Mary is established in a beautiful Long Island home as the long lost granddaughter. Bob, a reporter known to Mary in her dishwasher days, falls in love with her but is suspicious of her "relatives". He cables to Ireland and the real Fitzroy arrives. He recognizes the butler as his son, but at his request Mary never knows that he is her father. The man dies, Mary pleads for the freedom of the crooks and then goes back to Ireland with Bob and her real grandfather.

Cast
Constance Binney as Mary Malloy
Vincent Coleman as Bob Norton
Blanche Craig as Mrs. Nolan
William H. Strauss as Abe Timberg
Charles Mussett as Peter Venner
J.H. Gilmour as The Patrician
Malcolm Bradley as 'Paste' Parsons
Cecil Owen as The Derelict

References

External links

1921 films
American silent feature films
Films directed by John S. Robertson
American black-and-white films
Lost American films
American adventure films
1921 adventure films
1921 lost films
Lost adventure films
1920s American films
Silent adventure films